Farewell My Concubine (Chinese: 歌剧《霸王别姬》, geju "Bawang bie ji") is a Chinese-language western-style opera composed by choral conductor and composer Xiao Bai (萧白), to a libretto by Wang Jian (王健) for China National Opera House which toured America with the opera in 2008.

The opera is unrelated to the soundtrack to Chen Kaige's Farewell My Concubine, which was composed by Zhao Jiping.

References

Chinese western-style operas
Operas
2008 operas